804 Hispania is a minor planet orbiting the Sun. It was discovered from Barcelona (Spain) on 20 March 1915 by Josep Comas Solá (1868–1937), the first asteroid to be discovered by a Spaniard.

Hispania is a carbonaceous C-type asteroid. Busarev and Taran (2002) classed it as CP type with a spectrum that shows a highly hydrated body. It has a diameter of 122 kilometers according to measurements made with the W. M. Keck Observatory. This is 30% smaller than the size estimated from the IRAS observatory data. It has a size ratio of 1.16 between its major and minor axes. Two alternate rotation periods have been found for this asteroid: 7.4 hours and double that at 14.8 hours. To explain this discrepancy, it is possible the asteroid has a peculiar shape or it may be a double asteroid.

References

External links 
 Discovery Circumstances: Numbered Minor Planets (1)-(5000) – Minor Planet Center
 
 

000804
Discoveries by Josep Comas Solà
Named minor planets
000804
000804
19150320